Mohammed Helal (Arabic:محمد هلال) (born 11 February 1997) is an Emirati footballer who plays for Hatta as a midfielder.

Career

Al Wahda
Mohammed Helal started his career at Al-Wahda and is a product of the Al-Wehda's youth system. On 29 April 2018, Mohammed Helal made his professional debut for Al-Wehda against Al-Jazira in the Pro League, replacing Ahmed Al-Akbari and scored a goal in that match.

Emirates Club (loan)
On 20 January 2019 left Al-Wahda and signed with Emirates Club on loan until the end of the season. On 5 April 2019, Mohammed Helal made his professional debut for Emirates Club against Baniyas in the Pro League, replacing Eisa Ali.

Baniyas
On 3 June 2019 left Al-Wahda and signed with Baniyas.

Khor Fakkan (loan)
On 20 January 2020 left Baniyas and signed with Khor Fakkan on loan until the end of the season.

External links

References

1997 births
Living people
Emirati footballers
Al Wahda FC players
Emirates Club players
Baniyas Club players
Khor Fakkan Sports Club players
Hatta Club players
UAE Pro League players
UAE First Division League players
Association football midfielders
Place of birth missing (living people)